Clarence Eugene Faulk, Jr. (January 9, 1909 – March 5, 2010), was an American journalist who published from 1931 to 1962 the Ruston Daily Leader, the daily newspaper in Ruston in north Louisiana. Through the ownership of KRUS-AM radio, Faulk was a broadcaster. He was also engaged in real estate and a pioneer of self-storage warehousing, a business that he did not launch until after he was seventy years of age.

Early years

Faulk was born in West Monroe in Ouachita Parish, Louisiana, to C. E. Faulk, Sr. (1878–1951), and the former Josephine McClendon (1882–1962), who are interred there at Hasley Cemetery. Clarence Faulk, Sr. published the Monroe News Star in Monroe, Louisiana, and was a founder and the president from 1934 to 1945 of Delta Air Lines. He was chairman of the Delta board from 1948 until his death in 1951. Faulk's brother, Robert McClendon Faulk (1917–1988) of Vero Beach, Florida, was a World War II veteran and a Delta Air Lines pilot. A sister, Eleanor Faulk Cone (died 1993) of Falls Church, Virginia, was a graduate of Cornell University in Ithaca, New York, and Tulane University School of Law in New Orleans
  
After two years at the University of the South in Sewanee, Tennessee, Faulk transferred to the School of Journalism at the University of Missouri in Columbia, Missouri, where he met Louise Benson Page, a native of Topeka, Kansas, herself a journalism student. The couple married in 1931, a 72-year union that ended with her death on June 8, 2003, at the age of ninety-three. Faulk was publisher of the Ruston Daily Leader for thirty-one years until he sold the newspaper in 1962. In 1947, Faulk established KRUS, which he managed until 1968. For many years, he was the president of the Louisiana Press Association and the Louisiana Broadcasters Association.

Journalism and business career

The Faulks owned throughout Ruston numerous residential rental properties, a sixteen-unit apartment complex, and several commercial buildings. In 1988, Faulk was named the recipient of the "Russ Award", named for the founder of Ruston, Robert E. Russ, the highest honor that a resident of Ruston can receive through the Ruston-Lincoln Parish Chamber of Commerce. Faulk was active in Trinity United Methodist Church in Ruston and the Kiwanis International, of which he was a member for seventy years. He was also active in the Ruston-Lincoln Parish Centennial, the Lincoln Parish Library, and the Ruston Peach Festival. For nearly three decades, Faulk was the chairman of the Lincoln Parish Housing Authority. He was a contributor to the Louisiana Tech University Department of Journalism, having endowed the Clarence and Louise Faulk Chair of Journalism. In 1985, the Faulks were two of the first three persons to receive honorary doctoral degrees from Louisiana Tech. On the occasion of Faulk's 100th birthday in 2009, he received a Certificate of Honor from Louisiana Tech president Dan Reneau and a proclamation of "Clarence Faulk Day" from Ruston Mayor Dan Hollingsworth. There were also letters of commendation from Governor Bobby Jindal, then State Representative Hollis Downs of Ruston, and then U.S. Representative Rodney Alexander of Louisiana's 5th congressional district.
  
A source of oral history on the general Ruston area, Faulk was considered an expert on the 1934 ambush in Bienville Parish of the bandits Bonnie and Clyde, having covered the scene as the young publisher of the Ruston Daily Leader. He was an authority too on the former Camp Ruston, a prisoner of war facility that held German and Italian inmates during World War II. Himself classified 4-F during the war because of severe eye problems, Faulk nevertheless became a first lieutenant in the Home Guard. He was a member of the federal wartime Office of Price Administration, often called the "rationing board". He was the chairman of the Ruston area savings bond drive.  
   
Wiley W. Hilburn, former head of the Louisiana Tech Journalism Department, referred to the Faulks, accordingly: "Not only was Mrs. Faulk a full partner of her husband, Clarence Faulk, in the publishing of the 'Ruston Daily Leader', she was also a one-woman urban development team for Ruston. Her fingerprints are on half the architecture in this town. She had remarkable taste and an eye for design." As a teenaged reporter for the Daily Leader, Hilburn was fired three times by Clarence Faulk but reinstated each time when Mrs. Faulk intervened. Louise Faulk penned a column in The Daily Leader called "The Grapevine," which Hilburn described as "must reading for the whole town. It was a social column [with] political commentary." When Hilburn assumed leadership of the Louisiana Tech Journalism Department, the Faulks offered $60,000 to help him to upgrade the program. Hilburn described Mrs. Faulk as "always beautiful to see and so gracious. Of course, she was also a woman with power but she always used that sparingly and only to accomplish worthwhile goals." Mayor Hollingsworth agreed with Hilburn's analysis:

She was just such a special person to so many people. She had a kind and sensitive manner and a real sweetness about her. She and Clarence were so good to us as a family when we came here. They helped us in every way they could and we will always have a special place in our hearts for them. ... She had a great empathy for people and she gave of herself in so many ways. I will always remember how she and Clarence worked side by side on everything virtually their whole lives.

Later years

In his later years, Faulk was addressed by nearly everyone in Ruston as "Mr. Clarence." The Faulks had two sons, Clarence Eugene "Gene" Faulk, III, of Canandaigua, New York, and Dr. W. Page Faulk of St. Simons Island, Georgia; a daughter, Amelia Faulk Rauser of Rockville, Maryland, ten grandchildren, and seven great grandchildren. Grandson Alec Faulk of Ruston manages the West Side Self Storage begun by his grandfather. The couple is interred at Greenwood Cemetery in Ruston.

References

1909 births
2010 deaths
People from Ruston, Louisiana
People from West Monroe, Louisiana
Journalists from Louisiana
20th-century American newspaper publishers (people)
American broadcasters
Businesspeople from Louisiana
American real estate businesspeople
Methodists from Louisiana
Sewanee: The University of the South alumni
University of Missouri alumni
American centenarians
Men centenarians
American male journalists
20th-century American businesspeople